SPR Wisła Płock SA, competing for sponsorship reasons as Orlen Wisła Płock, is a professional men's handball club based in Płock in central Poland, founded in 1964. The club plays in the Polish Superliga. Seven–time Polish Champion and eleven times Polish Cup winner.

Honours

Domestic
 Polish Superliga
Winners (7): 1994–95, 2001–02, 2003–04, 2004–05, 2005–06, 2007–08, 2010–11

 Polish Cup
Winners (11): 1991–92, 1994–95, 1995–96, 1996–97, 1997–98, 1998–99, 2000–01, 2004–05, 2006–07, 2007–08, 2021–22

International
 EHF European League
Bronze (1): 2021–22

Former names
Wisła Płock – (1964–1992)
Petrochemia Płock – (1992–1999)
Petro Płock – (1999–2000)
Orlen Płock – (2000–2002)
Wisła Płock – (2002–2010)
SPR Wisła Płock – (2010–present)

Season by season

European record

EHF Champions League

EHF European League

Team

Current squad
Squad for the 2022–23 season

Goalkeepers
1  Ignacio Biosca Garcia
 20  Krystian Witkowski
 75  Marcel Jastrzębski
Left wingers
 11  Marcel Sroczyk
 26  Przemysław Krajewski
 34  Lovro Mihić
Right wingers 
 23  Filip Michałowicz
 25  Krzysztof Komarzewski
 29  Gonzalo Pérez Arce
Line players
 17  Abel Serdio
 19  Leon Šušnja
 33  Dawid Dawydzik

Left backs 
6  Tin Lučin 
 30  Mirsad Terzić
 99  Sergei Kosorotov
Centre backs
9  Kosuke Yasuhira 
 24  Gergő Fazekas
 55  Niko Mindegía 
89  Dmitry Zhitnikov
Right backs
3  Michał Daszek
7  Tomáš Piroch

Transfers
Transfers for the 2023–24 season

  Joining 
  Thomas Langerud (GK) (from  Haslum HK) 
  Mirko Alilović (GK) (from  SC Pick Szeged) 
  Kirill Samoilo (LB) (from  SKA Minsk) ?
  Miha Zarabec (CB) (from  THW Kiel) 

 Leaving
  Sergei Kosorotov (LB) (to  Telekom Veszprém) 

  Krystian Witkowski (GK)
  Ignacio Biosca (GK)

See also

References

External links
 Official website 

Polish handball clubs
Sport in Płock
Handball clubs established in 1964
1964 establishments in Poland